The Arsht Center is a performing arts center located in Miami, Florida. It is one of the largest performing arts centers in the United States. 

The center was partly built on the site of a former Sears department store; an Art Deco building constructed in 1929, pre-dating the Art Deco hotels on Ocean Drive.  It was added to the United States National Register of Historic Places in 1997 as Sears, Roebuck and Company Department Store. However, by 2001, the only surviving part of the original structure was the seven-story tower designed by Sears as its store's grand entrance.  The department store space itself had been demolished and developers decided to preserve the tower and incorporate it into the new performing arts center. It has been adaptively restored as a bookstore-café called the Café at Books & Books.

History

The Center opened as the Carnival Center on October 5, 2006, with performers, politicians and, movie stars attending, including Gloria Estefan, Jeb Bush, Andy García, and Bernadette Peters.

On January 10, 2008, it was announced that philanthropist and business leader Adrienne Arsht donated $30 million to the facility that would make it financially stable. In recognition for the gift, the former Carnival Center for the Performing Arts was renamed "The Adrienne Arsht Center for the Performing Arts of Miami-Dade County," or the Arsht Center for short.

In December 2008, M. John Richard joined the center as president and CEO after more than 20 years at the New Jersey Performing Arts Center (NJPAC).

Founded in 2011, the Town Square Neighborhood Development Corporation (“TSNDC”) was planned to oversee the development of the Arsht Center district. TSNDC's volunteer board: Armando Codina, chairman of Codina Partners, as chair; Manny Diaz, former City of Miami mayor, as vice chair; Michael Eidson, chairman of the Performing Arts Center Trust Board of Directors and partner of the South Florida law firm Colson Hicks Eidson, as treasurer; and Parker Thomson, founding chair of the Performing Arts Center Trust Board of Directors, as secretary. In 2019, Johann Zietsman succeeded John Richard as president and CEO after ten years in the same role at Arts Commons in Calgary.

The $470 million Adrienne Arsht Center for the Performing Arts, part of a gradually progressing redevelopment project in downtown Miami, has spurred more than $1 billion in economic impact in the neighborhood.

Architecture & venues

The center was designed by César Pelli and occupies two  sites straddling Biscayne Boulevard connected by a pedestrian bridge. Acoustics were designed by Russell Johnson of Artec Consultants company. He also worked on the Meyerson Symphony Center in Dallas.

There are three main venues all of which can be rented for event space by the public:
The Sanford and Dolores Ziff Ballet Opera House seats 2,400.
The John S. and James L. Knight Concert Hall seats 2,200.  Its stage extends into the audience and there is seating behind the stage for 200 additional spectators or a chorus. The orchestra level can be transformed into a "Grand Ballroom" with a festival floor configuration for dining and dancing for up to 850 people. The floor is installed over the seats.
Carnival Studio Theater is a flexible black-box space designed for up to 300 seats.

In addition, there are two smaller multi-purpose venues:
The Peacock Rehearsal Studio holds 270 people.
Parker and Vann Thomson Plaza for the Arts is an outdoor social and performance space linking the two main houses across Biscayne Blvd.

Events and performances 

Programmatic series include Jazz Roots, the Knight Masterworks Season - Ziff Classical Music Series and Ziff Dance Series, Theater Up Close, Live At Knight, Flamenco Festival, Miami Light Projects Here and Now Festival, and City Theatre's Yearly Short Play Festival. For research purpose, the place is quite suitable. So, the people who're interested in viewing such artifacts, can visit here using airways and at affordable prices. The center hosts approximately 400 performances and events each year, which attract an average of 450,000 people to Miami's urban core. More than 85% of the performances at the center are presented by the center.

Presidential Debates 
The center was the site of the first Democratic primary debate of the 2020 presidential campaign, held on June 26–27, 2019, and was due to host the second of three general election debates in October 2020, but this did not go ahead. President Donald Trump had contracted COVID-19 in the week before the debate and was recovering from it; for reasons of safety, the Commission on Presidential Debates proposed a virtual debate instead but Trump refused to participate.  Instead, NBC News held a town-hall style event with President Trump alone, moderated by Savannah Guthrie, within the outdoor portico of the neighbouring Pérez Art Museum; the Democratic nominee, former Vice-President Joe Biden, participated in a simultaneous town-hall debate with George Stephanopoulos for ABC News at the National Constitution Center in Philadelphia, Pennsylvania.

Broadway in Miami series 
The 2018-2019 Broadway in Miami series included Hello Dolly, Irving Berlin's White Christmas, Les Misérables, Waitress, School of Rock: The Musical, Come From Away, and The Lion King. As a bonus to subscribers of the 2018/19 season, they were promised first access to Hamilton tickets once those went on sale.

2017-2018 shows included On Your Feet!: The Story of Emilio and Gloria Estefan, The Bodyguard, Finding Neverland, The Color Purple, Chicago, and The Book of Mormon.

Education

Educational programs, many of which are planned with Miami-Dade Public Schools, Miami-Dade County Department of Cultural Affairs, the resident companies, and community-based organizations, offer unique opportunities for young people and adults to learn about and enjoy the performing arts both in the center and out in their communities. Examples include Ailey Camp, a six-week full scholarship summer camp which debuted in 2009; and the Learning Through the Arts program, which provides live music, theater and dance components via the public school system's Passport to Culture initiative. Rock Odyssey is the flagship of the Learning Through the Arts program. It brings 25,000 fifth graders to the Center every year to enjoy a live rock-and-roll musical based on Homer's Odyssey - all free of charge to students and schools.

See also
List of concert halls

References

External links
Official website

2006 establishments in Florida
Buildings and structures completed in 2006
Buildings and structures in Miami
Concert halls in Florida
Culture of Miami
César Pelli buildings
Event venues established in 2006
Event venues on the National Register of Historic Places in Florida
Music venues in Florida
Opera houses in Florida
Performing arts centers in Florida
Tourist attractions in Miami